Look My Way may refer to:

 Look My Way (Madball album) 
 Look My Way (Rosemary Clooney album)
 "Look My Way" (The Vels song)
 "Look My Way", a song by Britny Fox from Bite Down Hard
 "Look My Way", a song by Joe Satriani from Joe Satriani
 "Look My Way", a song by Kylie Minogue from Kylie